The 1922 New Jersey gubernatorial election was held on November 7, 1922. Democratic nominee George Sebastian Silzer defeated Republican nominee William Nelson Runyon with 52.19% of the vote.

Democratic primary

Candidates
George Sebastian Silzer, judge and former State Senator for Middlesex County

Withdrew
William E. Tuttle Jr., New Jersey Commissioner of Banking and former U.S. Representative from Westfield

Campaign
George Sebastian Silzer ran with the backing of Jersey City boss Frank Hague and as a firm opponent of Prohibition. The race was a two-way contest between Silzer and William E. Tuttle Jr. until Tuttle abruptly withdrew in early September, citing his health and leaving both candidates unopposed in their respective primaries.

Republican primary

Candidates
William Nelson Runyon, State Senator for Union County and former acting Governor

Campaign
The uncontested primary was largely uneventful until August, when a member of the Democratic State Committee accused Runyon, a supporter of Prohibition, of delivering a speech in Collingswood under the influence of alcohol. Both Democratic candidates were in attendance at the event and personally rebuked the claim, which the committeewoman, Katharine McTague Donges, denied making. Runyon demanded a full retraction, threatening a libel suit against Donges. Around the same time, Governor Edward I. Edwards allegedly made a similar insinuation regarding a speech Runyon delivered in Sea Girt, though Edwards denied the claim.

General election

Candidates
George Sebastian Silzer, judge and former State Senator for Middlesex County (Democratic)
William Nelson Runyon, State Senator for Union County  and former acting Governor (Republican)

Results

References

1922
New Jersey
1922 New Jersey elections
November 1922 events